Seven Easy Pieces is the first EP and third overall release by American garage rock band the Detroit Cobras, released in March 2003 on Rough Trade Records of London, and distributed in Spain by Sinnamon Records of Barcelona. This particular mini-album was appended to a pressing of Baby by Bloodshot Records.

Track listing
"Ya Ya Ya (Looking for My Baby)"
original written by Doc Starkes, Melvin Smith of the Nite Riders
"My Baby Loves the Secret Agent"
original written by Fred Sledge Smith of The Olympics
"Heartbeat"
original written by Edward C. Cobb for singer Gloria Jones
"You Don't Knock"
original written by Roebuck "Pops" Staples of The Staple Singers
"Silver & Gold (When I Get Like This)"
original written Carl Lebow and Otto Jeffries by for The "5" Royales
"99 and a Half Just Won't Do"
original written by Ronald G. King for Dorothy Love Coates
"Insane Asylum"
original written by Willie Dixon for Koko Taylor

Personnel
Rachel Nagy - Vocals
Mary Ramirez - Guitar / Vocals
Greg Cartwright - Guitar / Vocals on Insane Asylum
Eddie Harsch - Bass / Keys / Vocals
Kenny Tudrick - Drums / Vocals on Insane Asylum
Joey Mazzola - Guitar solo on Ya Ya Ya (Looking for My Baby)
Steve Nawara - additional Guitar on Silver & Gold (When I Get Like This)

notes
Al Sutton - Audio Engineer 
Jeff Teader - UK graphic designer and Art Director at Oskar Design
Glen Barr - front cover Painting
Nancy Paterra - Liner note Photography
Brian T Kirchner - back cover Photography

References

2003 debut EPs
The Detroit Cobras albums